A by-election was held for the New South Wales Legislative Assembly electorate of Newtown on 1 December 1881. The election was triggered by the appointment of Stephen Brown to the Legislative Council, taking up the office of Postmaster-General.

The Carcoar by-election was held the same day.

Dates

Results

Stephen Brown was appointed to the Legislative Council.

See also
Electoral results for the district of Newtown
List of New South Wales state by-elections

References

1881 elections in Australia
New South Wales state by-elections
1880s in New South Wales